George Heath D.D. (baptised 3 December 1745 – 23 February 1822) was a Canon of Windsor from 1800 to 1822 and Head Master of Eton College from 1792 to 1802.

Career

He was born the younger son of the scholar Benjamin Heath (1704–1766) and was educated at King's College, Cambridge. His elder brother Benjamin was Headmaster of Harrow School.

He was appointed:
Head Master of Eton College, 1792–1802
Rector of Monks Risborough
Vicar of Sturminster Marshall, Dorset
Vicar of Piddletown
Vicar of East Beachworth, 1805–1814
 Fellow of the Royal Society, 1795–1822 

He was appointed to the fourth stall in St George's Chapel, Windsor Castle in 1800, and held the stall until 1822.

Notes 

1745 births
1822 deaths
Alumni of King's College, Cambridge
Canons of Windsor
Head Masters of Eton College
Fellows of the Royal Society